{{DISPLAYTITLE:C24H32O9}}
The molecular formula C24H32O9 (molar mass: 464.50 g/mol, exact mass: 464.2046 u) may refer to:

 Estriol 16-glucuronide
 Estriol 3-glucuronide

Molecular formulas